John Douglas Thompson (born 1964) is an English-American actor. He is a Tony Award nominee and the recipient of two Drama Desk Awards, two Obie Awards, an Outer Critics Circle Award, and a Lucille Lortel Award.

The New York Times critic Ben Brantley described Thompson as "one of the most compelling classical stage actors of his generation".

Early life and education
Thompson was born in Bath, England, to Jamaican parents, and was raised in Montreal, Quebec, and then  Rochester, NY. He graduated from Le Moyne College in Syracuse, New York in 1985, where he studied marketing and business. In the early 1990s he worked as a traveling computer salesman in New England. After losing his job, Thompson decided to pursue acting and enrolled at the Brown University/Trinity Repertory Company program in Providence, Rhode Island.

Career
Thompson began appearing in a variety of lead and supporting roles across New England, most notably at the American Repertory Theater and Shakespeare and Company, also giving his first performance as Othello at the Trinity Repertory Company prior to attaining critical success in New York.

In 2005, he made his Broadway debut, opposite Denzel Washington, as Flavius in Julius Caesar, and later played Le Bret in the 2007 Broadway production of Cyrano de Bergerac, alongside Jennifer Garner and Kevin Kline.

Thompson had a breakout year in 2009, garnering critical acclaim for playing the titular roles in the Off-Broadway productions of Othello and The Emperor Jones, with The New York Times stating "There may be no better classical actor working in the New York theater right now". He won a Lucille Lortel Award and an Obie Award for his performance in Othello, and received a Drama Desk Award nomination for The Emperor Jones.

He starred opposite Kate Mulgrew as Antony in a regional production of Antony and Cleopatra in Hartford, Connecticut in 2010, and played Joe Mott in a 2012 production of The Iceman Cometh in Chicago with Nathan Lane and Brian Dennehy. Also in 2012, Thompson appeared in The Bourne Legacy in the minor role of Lt. Gen. Paulsen.

Thompson received rave reviews for originating the role of Louis Armstrong and other characters in the 2014 Off-Broadway production of the one-actor play Satchmo at the Waldorf, which he reprised at the Wallis Annenberg Center for the Performing Arts in Beverly Hills. He received a Drama Desk Award and an Outer Critics Circle Award for his solo performance.

In 2014, he played the titular role in the Off-Broadway production of Tamburlaine, Parts I and II, and reprised his performance as Joe Mott in the 2015 New York transfer of the Chicago production of The Iceman Cometh. Thompson won a second Obie Award for his performance in both plays, and was presented with a special Drama Desk Award in the same year for "invigorating theater in New York through his commanding presence, classical expertise, and vocal prowess".

In 2018, Thompson appeared in the role of The Starkeeper in Broadway's Carousel, Imperial Theatre, New York, alongside Joshua Henry, Jessie Mueller, and Renee Fleming.

In addition to his theater work, Thompson has appeared on television in Law & Order, Law & Order: SVU and Conviction. He also appeared in the short film Midway and the legal drama Michael Clayton. He appears as Dr. Mitchell in the 2020 HBO MAX film Let Them All Talk directed by Steven Soderbergh.

In the 2022 film Till, Thompson  plays Emmett Till's Mississippi uncle Mose Wright; his performance was singled out by Oscar nominee Andrea Riseborough as the one "from the past year you’ve been especially moved by".

Selected stage work

Awards and nominations

References

External links
 
 
 

American male film actors
American male stage actors
Obie Award recipients
Le Moyne College alumni
People from Bath, Somerset
American people of Jamaican descent
Living people
1964 births